Phallusia fumigata is a species of tunicate, a marine invertebrate in the family Ascidiidae.

References

External links 
 DORIS

Enterogona